Frank Lima may refer to:

Frank Lima (poet) (1939–2013), American poet
Frank Lima, better known as The Great Morgani, American street performer

See also
Frank De Lima (born 1949), comedian from Hawaii